XHSBT-FM is a radio station on 99.5 FM in San Buenaventura, Chihuahua, Mexico. It is owned by Grupo BM Radio and known as La Que Buena de San Buena.

History
XHSBT received its concession on October 28, 1994. It was initially owned by Ernesto Agustín Salayandia García.

The station briefly broadcast a Christian format known as La Voz from 2021 to 2022.

References

Christian radio stations in Mexico
Radio stations in Chihuahua